5'-AMP-activated protein kinase catalytic subunit alpha-1 is an enzyme that in humans is encoded by the PRKAA1 gene.

The protein encoded by this gene belongs to the serine/threonine protein kinase family. It is the catalytic subunit of the 5'-prime-AMP-activated protein kinase (AMPK). AMPK is a cellular energy sensor conserved in all eukaryotic cells. The kinase activity of AMPK is activated by the stimuli that increase the cellular AMP/ATP ratio. AMPK regulates the activities of a number of key metabolic enzymes through phosphorylation. It protects cells from stresses that cause ATP depletion by switching off ATP-consuming biosynthetic pathways. Alternatively spliced transcript variants encoding distinct isoforms have been observed.

Interactions
Protein kinase, AMP-activated, alpha 1 has been shown to interact with TSC2.

References

Further reading

External links 
 PDBe-KB provides an overview of all the structure information available in the PDB for Human 5'-AMP-activated protein kinase catalytic subunit alpha-1 (PRKAA1)

EC 2.7.11